Müşfiq (known as Zaliyevka until 1999) is a village in the municipality of Müşkür in the Khachmaz Rayon of Azerbaijan.

References

Populated places in Khachmaz District